The Canada–Israel Free Trade Agreement (CIFTA) is a free trade agreement between Canada and Israel.

History 
It was signed on July 31, 1996, and came into effect on January 1, 1997. It was Canada's first free trade agreement outside of the Western Hemisphere. 80% Tariffs on most manufactured and agricultural goods were eliminated. However, CIFTA does not affect certain agriculture sectors like poultry, dairy and eggs.

CIFTA was amended in 2002, 2003 and 2015.
On May 27, 2019, Bill C-85 went before parliament to amend CIFTA and received royal assent. This most recent amendment was in force from September 1, 2019.
The first amendment allows certain products like textiles to undergo some levels of processing in the United States without losing their status while in transit. The second amendment further reduced agricultural tariffs.

CIFTA's main goals include:
The elimination of trade barriers and tariffs
Promotion of fair competition
The increase of investments between the two nations

While Israel is not one of Canada's major trading partners, the Canadian government sought to put Canadian businesses on the same footing as US businesses, who were benefiting from the US-Israel Free Trade Agreement. Bilateral trade increased to $1.24 billion by 2005 .

History of trade balances

Amounts in thousands of Canadian dollars ($CDN).

Exploratory discussions for the modernization

There are a number of ongoing discussions for the modernization of the agreement.

References

External links 
  Text of the treaty
 Canada–Israel Free Trade Agreement (CIFTA) page on the Rules of Origin Facilitator, with member countries' status and access to legal documents.

Israel
Foreign trade of Israel
1996 in Israel
Treaties concluded in 1996
Treaties entered into force in 1997
Canada–Israel relations
1996 in Canada
1996 in Canadian law